The 2002 NHK Trophy was the final event of six in the 2002–03 ISU Grand Prix of Figure Skating, a senior-level international invitational competition series. It was held at the Kyoto Aquarena in Kyoto on November 28 – December 1. Medals were awarded in the disciplines of men's singles, ladies' singles, pair skating, and ice dancing. Skaters earned points toward qualifying for the 2002–03 Grand Prix Final. The compulsory dance was the Tango Romantica.

Results

Men

Ladies

Pairs

Ice dancing

External links
 2002 NHK Trophy
 Official site

Nhk Trophy, 2002
NHK Trophy